The 1969–70 season was FC Dinamo București's 21st season in Divizia A. Dumitru Nicolae Nicuşor is brought back as manager and he starts to rejuvenate the first team, by promoting some players from the second team, such as Florin Cheran and Iosif Cavai. After a good first half in the championship, ended on the second position, Dinamo had a modest second half, and finished the competition only fifth. In the Romanian Cup, Dinamo reaches the third final in a row, but loses again the trophy.

Results

Romanian Cup final

Transfers 

Before the season, Dinamo transferred Augustin Deleanu from Poli Iasi, Lică Nunweiller from Dinamo Bacău and Marin Andrei from Steaua. Florin Cheran, Iosif Cavai, Alexandru Moldovan and Vasile Dobrău are promoted from the second squad.

Some players were transferred abroad: Ilie Datcu to Fenerbahçe, Lică Nunweiller and Cornel Popa to Beşiktaş, Iosif Varga to Wuppertaler SV.

References 
 www.labtof.ro
 www.romaniansoccer.ro

1969
Association football clubs 1969–70 season
Dinamo